Elia Petrelli (born 15 August 2001) is an Italian footballer who plays as a forward for  club Siena, on loan from Genoa.

Club career
Petrelli joined the Juventus youth teams in the summer of 2016. He made his Serie C debut for Juventus U23 on 23 December 2018, in a game against Virtus Entella as a 72nd-minute substitute for Stephy Mavididi. On 22 November 2020, Petrelli scored a hat-trick during the 2020–21 season against Pistoiese, helping Juventus U23 win 3–2.

On 29 January 2021, Petrelli moved to Genoa for a fee of €8 million, plus a maximum of €5.3 million in performance-related bonuses. He was subsequently loaned to Reggina until the end of the 2020–21 season.

On 16 August 2021, Petrelli was loaned to Ascoli. He did not make any appearances for Ascoli in the first half of the season, and on 22 January 2022 he moved on a new loan to Serie C club Carrarese.

On 26 July 2022, Petrelli moved on loan to Serie C club Triestina. On 20 January 2023, he joined Siena on loan.

International career
Petrelli was first called up to represent his country for the under-16 squad in a friendly against Turkey in December 2016. He was called up to the under-17 team for the Euro qualifiers in October 2017, but remained on the bench in all three games.

In August 2018, Petrelli played in friendlies for Italy U18 and scored a goal against Serbia. In October 2018, he participated in the Euro qualifiers for the under-19 squad.

References

External links
 

2001 births
People from Cesena
Sportspeople from the Province of Forlì-Cesena
Footballers from Emilia-Romagna
Living people
Italian footballers
Italy youth international footballers
Association football forwards
Juventus Next Gen players
Genoa C.F.C. players
Reggina 1914 players
Ascoli Calcio 1898 F.C. players
Carrarese Calcio players
U.S. Triestina Calcio 1918 players
A.C.N. Siena 1904 players
Serie C players
Serie B players